Asiah binti Md Ariff is a Malaysian politician and former Johor State Executive Councillor.

Election Results

Honours

Honours of Malaysia 
  :
 Member of the Order of the Defender of the Realm (AMN) (2003)
  Officer of the Order of the Defender of the Realm (KMN) (2015)
  Companion of the Order of Loyalty to the Crown of Malaysia (JSM) (2022)
  :
  Silver Medal of the Sultan Ibrahim of Johor Medal (PSI II) (2015)

References 

Living people
People from Johor
Malaysian people of Malay descent
Malaysian Muslims
United Malays National Organisation politicians
21st-century Malaysian politicians
Women MLAs in Johor
Members of the Johor State Legislative Assembly
Johor state executive councillors
Companions of the Order of Loyalty to the Crown of Malaysia
Officers of the Order of the Defender of the Realm
Members of the Order of the Defender of the Realm
1961 births
21st-century Malaysian women politicians